This is a partial list of festivals and celebrations in Pennsylvania.

March
Pennsylvania Maple Festival - Meyersdale

April
 Philadelphia Film Festival - Philadelphia

May
 Bridgefest - Oil City
 Fairie Festival at Spyglass Ridge Winery - May 2 and 3, 2020 at Spyglass Ridge Winery 105 Carroll Rd in Sunbury 
 Fine Arts Fiesta - third week in May in Wilkes-Barre
 Mayfair - Allentown
 Peddler's Village Strawberry Festival - first weekend in May in Lahaska
 Phoenixville Beer & Wine Festival - the Saturday of Mother's Day weekend - in Phoenixville
 Silk Screen Asian American Film Festival - Pittsburgh

June
 Artifest at the Museum of Indian Culture - Allentown
 Moravian Historical Society Arts & Crafts Festival - Nazareth
 SouthSide Film Festival - Bethlehem
 Three Rivers Arts Festival - Pittsburgh
 Thunder in the Valley motorcycle rally - Johnstown

July
 American MusicFest - Harrisburg
 Central Pennsylvania Festival of the Arts - State College
 Kutztown Folk Festival - Kutztown
 Pennsic War - Slippery Rock
 Philadelphia International Gay & Lesbian Film Festival - Philadelphia
 Roar on the Shore - Erie
 Rootz: The Green City Music Festival - Pittsburgh

August
 Fresh Fest Beer Fest - Pittsburgh
 Great Allentown Fair - Allentown
 Harford Fair - Harford Township
 Musikfest - Bethlehem
 OilFest- Titusville
 Philadelphia Folk Festival - Schwenksville
 Roasting Ears of Corn Festival - Native American heritage festival in Allentown
 The Corn Festival] - Shippensburg
 The Peach Music Festival - Scranton
 Thunder Mountain Lenapé Nation - Saltsburg

September
 Bloomsburg Fair - Bloomsburg
 Budweiser Made in America Festival - Philadelphia
 Ephrata Fair - Ephrata
 Great Allentown Fair - Allentown
 Little Italy Days - Bloomfield
 Lyons Fiddle Festival
 Mushroom Festival - Kennett Square
 Pittsburgh Dragon Boat Festival - Pittsburgh (South Side)
 Scottdale Fall Festival - Scottdale

October
 Applefest - first weekend in October in Franklin
 New Holland Farmer's Fair - New Holland
 Paoli Blues Fest - first Saturday in October in Paoli
 Philadelphia Asian American Film Festival - Philadelphia
 Pottstown Brew Fest - Pottstown

References

External links
Festivals in PA official website
Events and festivals at VisitPA website

 
Pennsylvania
Pennsylvania
Festivals